Major-General John Vaughan,   (1871–1956) was a cavalry officer in the 7th (Queen's Own) Hussars and the
10th (The Prince of Wales's Own) Royal Hussars of the British Army.

He fought in several conflicts on the African continent. During the First World War he commanded the 3rd Cavalry Brigade and then the 3rd Cavalry Division, for which he was awarded an Order of the Bath, and a Bar for the Distinguished Service Order, the first of which he had received in South Africa.

Post war he became the Welsh President of the British Legion, a Deputy Lieutenant for Merionethshire and a Justice of the Peace. During the Second World War he returned to the army as a Zone Commander in the Home Guard.

Early life
John Vaughan was born 31 July 1871, at Nannau, Dolgellau, Merionethshire in Wales. He was the second son of John and Elinor Anne Vaughan, of a family that could trace their roots back to a line of Welsh princes in the Middle Ages. He was educated at Eton College before attending the Royal Military College, Sandhurst.

Military career

7th (Queen's Own) Hussars
Vaughan was later to write "my military career was mapped out for me when I was still in the cradle". It all began when he graduated from Sandhurst in March 1891 and joined the 7th (Queen's Own) Hussars, with the rank of second-lieutenant.
His promotion to lieutenant came on 4 September 1894, before seeing his first active service, in South Africa, during the 1896 Matabele relief expedition. The following year he participated in the Mashonaland War and the Sudan campaign in 1898. He was then promoted to captain on 9 October 1899, before being seconded for service in the Second Boer War in December.

Second Boer War
In South Africa, Vaughan was the senior aide-de-camp and deputy assistant adjutant-general to Lieutenant-General John French, the commander of the Cavalry Division, and was mentioned in dispatches in February 1900, and promoted to brevet major on 29 November 1900.
By March 1902, Vaughan was acting as the intelligence officer for a column consisting of the 7th Hussars and the 2nd Dragoon Guards (Queen's Bays). On 1 April he captured Commandant Pretorius as he was trying to escape and was soon after seriously wounded. However, for his conduct during the campaign, he was made a Companion of the Distinguished Service Order (DSO) and twice more mentioned in dispatches (including one dated 1 June 1902, where he is commended for valuable work in the action at Holspruit 1 April 1902). He left Cape Town on the SS Roslin Castle in late May 1902, and arrived home the following month.
After the war, in January 1904, having recovered from his injuries, Vaughan became the brigade major for the 1st Cavalry Brigade.

10th (The Prince of Wales's Own) Royal Hussars
On 14 May 1904, Vaughan was promoted to substantive major and transferred to the 10th (The Prince of Wales's Own) Royal Hussars.

In May 1908 he was promoted to lieutenant-colonel and given command of the 10th Hussars.
His tenure in command ended in January 1911, Vaughan became the Commandant of the Cavalry School, with the temporary rank of colonel.

Vaughan during this time was also a noted Polo player with a handicap of eight. He was one of a small group of commanding officer that also played for their regiment's Polo team, Hubert Gough 16th (Queen's) Lancers with Bertram Portal and Douglas Haig both 17th (The Duke of Cambridge's Own) Lancers being the others. Another sport Vaughan participated in was fox hunting, he even included it on the syllabus of the Cavalry School under the pretext "memory training". It was while he was at the Cavalry School that he married Louisa Evelyn, 22 October 1913, the eldest daughter of a Captain J. Stewart of Cardiganshire.

First World War
At the start of the First World War Vaughan was Chief of Staff (GSO1) for Edmund Allenby, the commander of the 1st Cavalry Division. Then on 16 September 1914 he took over from Hubert Gough as the commander of the 3rd Cavalry Brigade. The three regiments under his command being the 4th (Queen's Own) Hussars, 5th (Royal Irish) Lancers and the 16th (The Queen's) Lancers. At the same time he was also promoted to temporary brigadier-general. Vaughan wrote about his time in command of the brigade; "I was of course more than sorry to leave 3rd Cavalry Brigade with whom I had been for the toughest part of the war with very few men, very few shells and no reserves. I had however always absolute confidence in every unit and they had proved themselves absolutely reliable and versatile in everything they were asked to do". In October 1915, Vaughan was promoted to temporary major-general and given command of the 3rd Cavalry Division, commanding the 6th, 7th and the 8th Cavalry Brigades. While still in command he was made a Deputy Lieutenant for Merionethshire in October 1917. His command of the division ended on 14 March 1918, when he became the Inspector of Quarter Master General Services.

During his time in command, it was not involved in any major battles in 1916, then in 1917 it participated in the First Battle of the Scarpe (9–12 April) and the attack at Monchy-le-Preux (10–11 April) both part of the Battle of Arras.

During the war Vaughan was again mentioned in despatches, made a Companion of the Order of the Bath in 1915 and given a Bar to the Distinguished Service Order in 1919 and also became a Commander of the Légion d'honneur.

Later life
Vaughan retired from the army in 1920. In 1932 he became the Welsh President of the British Legion, a Justice of the Peace and remained the Deputy Lieutenant of Merionethshire until 1954. He briefly returned to the army during the Second World War as a Zone Commander in the Home Guard. In 1955 he had a book published, Cavalry and Sporting Memories, recounting some of his experiences. John Vaughan died after falling off his horse 21 January 1956.

Further reading

References

External links
National Archives record for the Vaughan family from the 12th Century to present

British Army cavalry generals of World War I
Companions of the Order of the Bath
Companions of the Distinguished Service Order
Commandeurs of the Légion d'honneur
7th Queen's Own Hussars officers
10th Royal Hussars officers
Deputy Lieutenants of Merionethshire
Welsh justices of the peace
People from Dolgellau
People educated at Eton College
Graduates of the Royal Military College, Sandhurst
1871 births
1956 deaths
British Army generals
Military personnel from Merionethshire